Mónica de Miranda (born Porto, 1976) is a Portuguese visual artist, photographer, filmmaker, and researcher of Angolan ancestry who works on postcolonial issues of geography, history, and subjectivity mostly related to Africa and its diaspora. Her mediums include photography, mixed media and video. De Miranda first became known for her photographic documentation of the ruins of modern hotels in post-war Angola, and of its sociopolitical significance. Her photographic series, videos, short films, and installations have been internationally exhibited at art biennales, galleries, and museums, some of which keep her work in their permanent art collections. Her work has been reviewed in specialized art sources.

Miranda was born in Porto and is based in Lisbon since 2009.

Education 

De Miranda graduated as a Bachelor of Visual Arts from the Camberwell College of Arts, London, in 1998. She completed an MSc in Art and Education at the Institute of Education, London, in 2000, and obtained a PhD degree in Visual Arts and Multimedia at the University of Middlesex in 2014 (Thesis: Geography of Affections: Tales of Identity, Diaspora and Travel in contemporary arts). She pursued postdoctoral studies at the University of Lisbon between 2015 and 2018.

Career 

De Miranda is affiliated to the University of Lisbon, Centro de Estudos Comparatistas, Faculdade de Letras, where she works as a researcher, in projects dealing with sociocultural and political aspects of contemporary migration movements linked to lusophone Africa. Among such projects are Post-Archive: Politics of Memory, Place and Identity, and Visual Culture, Migration, Globalization and Decolonization.

During her multiyear stay in London prior to 2009, she collaborated with researchers at Goldsmiths College and the Institute of International Visual Arts. In projects involving Tate Britain, she worked with underprivileged adolescents in schools and community centres in the boroughs of Peckham and Brixton.

In Lisbon, she is a co-founder of Xerem,  a cultural association that runs a programme of international residencies and workshops for artists and is part of The Triangle Network; She is also a Director and artistic coordinator at Hangar, an art research center in Graça founded in 2014  .

Founder of the Project Hangar at the Center of Artistic Research in Lisbon.

Further details of De Miranda's career can be found online.

Works 

De Miranda's work is research-based and looks at the convergence of politics, gender, memory and space. Her works typically consist of video, photography and installation, which frequently register the artist's view on urban and peri-urban, Luso-African landscape and associated contemporary and colonial history. Her works have been shown at art biennales including the Dakar Biennal, Bamako Biennal & Bienal de Sur, galleries, and museums including the Berardo Collection Museum (Lisbon 2016), the Pera Museum (Istanbul 2017) the Museu Nacional de Arte Contemporânea do Chiado (MNAC, Lisbon 2014), the Museum of Art, Architecture and Technology (Lisbon 2019), and the Calouste Gulbenkian Museum (Lisbon 2020). The latter three museums, as well as the Lisbon Municipal Archive, the PLMJ Foundation, and the Centro Cultural de Lagos keep De Miranda's pieces in their permanent art collections. Her pieces have been nominated to the Novo Banco Photo Award (2016), and the Novos Artistas Award of Fundação EDP in 2019. Her exhibition Geografia Dormente was nominated to the Best Photographic Work of the Authors Prize – 2019 by the Sociedade Portuguesa de Autores. Substantial critique of De Miranda's artwork can be found online, where she has been regarded as an artist whose work crosses borders and outlines a landscape of plural identities, inspired by her own experience of an increasingly itinerant culture. Monica's images are lyrical, performative, and contemplated quiet moments that offer a kind of solace...very reflective and melancholic, has written Marigold Warner, Associate Online Editor at the British Journal of Photography when reviewing De Miranda's artwork.

Her best known pieces include Panorama, Hotel Globo, Contos de Lisboa, and Circular do Sul. Her work has been reviewed in specialized art sources such as New York, L'Œil de la photographie, British Journal of Photography, and Aesthetica Magazine.

De Miranda's oeuvre has been the subject of study of a number of academic works, examining aspects such as her sarcastic photography, the deep sociopolitical meanings behind her films, the aesthetics of fragmenting, moving and doubling in her photographic installations, and her influence on contemporary Portuguese videoart.

Exhibitions

 Nov 2004 - The Search For Identity, group show, Doncaster Museum & Art Gallery, Doncaster, UK
 Feb 2005 In the Bag!,  group show, Brixton Art Gallery, Brixton, London
 Apr 2013 – Private Lives, group show, Caiscais Cultural Center, Cascais, Portugal
 Jun 2014 – Ilha de São Jorge, 6-film exhibition shown at the 14th Venice Biennale of Architecture, Venice. Italy
 Oct 2015 - Telling Time, group show, Rencontres africaines de la photographie 10th edition, Bamako, Mali
 Jul 2015 – Hotel Globo, Museu Nacional de Arte Contemporânea do Chiado, Lisbon
 Sep 2015 O Reverso da Convivência, group show, Museu Nacional de Arte Contemporânea do Chiado, Lisbon
 May 2016 – 12th Dakar Biennale, Dak'Art – Biennale de l'Art Africain Contemporain, Dakar, Senegal
 Oct 2016 - Bienal de Fotografia Vila Franca de Xira, group show, Galeria Paulo Nunes, Lisbon
 Dec 2016 – Addis Foto Fest, Addis Ababa, Ethiopia
 Feb 2017 –  Field work, 3 finalist show, Novo Banco Photo Prize, Museu Coleção Berardo, Lisbon
 Mar 2017 – Lejour qui vient, Galerie des Galeries, Paris, France
 Jun 2017 – Atlantic – A Journey to the center of the earth. solo show, Galeria Sabrina Amrani, Madrid, Spain
 Nov 2017 – AKAA, Also Known As Africa Art Fair, group show, Carreau du Temple, Paris, France
 Jan 2018 – Transfer, solo show and residence, Académie des Beaux Arts de Kinshasa, República Democrática do Congo
 Ago 2018 – Daqui Pra Frente – Arte Contemporânea em Angola, Caixa Cultural Brasília, Brasil
 Sep 2018 –  Tomorrow is another day, solo show, Carlos Carvalho – Arte Contemporánea
 Nov 2018 – Geografia Dormente, solo show, Galeria Municipal de Arte de Almada, Portugal
 Nov 2018 – Panorama, solo show, Galería do Banco Económico, Luanda, Angola.
 Mar 2019 – Fiction and Fabrication, group show, Museum of Art Architecture and Technology, Lisbon  
 Oct 2019 – Bienal Sur, group show, Guayaquil, Ecuador
 Nov 2019, Taxidermy of the Future, two artist show, VI Bienal de Lubumbashi, Congo
 Dec 2019 - Taxidermy of the future, group show, National Museum of Natural History, Luanda, Angola
 Feb 2020 Twins (from series Cinema Karl Marx) – group show Partidas e Chegadas – Artistas em Viagem, Calouste Gulbenkian Museum, Lisbon
 Mar 2020 – African Cosmologies, group show, Fotofest Biennial. Houston, USA.
 May 2020 – Contos de Lisboa, solo show, Arquivo Municipal de Lisboa, Lisbon
Dec 2020 – Deconstruction/Reconstruction, Sabrina Amrani Gallery, Madrid
The above list does not necessarily include all of De Miranda's exhibitions.

Publications
De Miranda's publications include the following books and book chapters:

 De Miranda, Monica (2005), Changing geographies: art without borders : participation, collaboration and interaction in socially engaged arts (Thesis).
 De Miranda, M. & Tavares E., (2017),Geography of affections, 2012–2016, Ed. Tyburn Gallery, 
 De Miranda, Mónica, Hotel Globo, chapter 13 in (Re)imagining African independence : film, visual arts and the fall of the Portuguese empire. Piçarra, Maria do Carmo, 1970-, Castro, Teresa, 1952-. Oxford, 2017 
 De Miranda, Mónica, (2018), Atlantica : contemporary art from Angola and its diaspora.  (1st edition ed., 2019). Lisbon,

References

External links
 Artist's website Monica de Miranda
 Mónica de Miranda: Geography of Affections 

1976 births
Artists from Porto
People from Lisbon
Portuguese women photographers
20th-century women photographers
20th-century Portuguese artists
Portuguese photographers
Portuguese women artists
Portuguese women film directors
Portuguese people of Angolan descent
Living people